Lucilla Perrotta (born 3 June 1975 in Rome) is a female professional beach volleyball player from Italy, who twice represented her native country at the Summer Olympics: 2000 and 2004. Partnering Daniela Gattelli she claimed the gold medal at the 2002 European Championships in Basel, Switzerland.

Playing partners
 Daniela Gattelli
 Daniela Gioria
 Laura Bruschini
 Giulia Momoli
 Diletta Lunardi
 Cristiana Parenzan
 Nicoletta Luciani

References

External links
 
 

1975 births
Living people
Italian beach volleyball players
Women's beach volleyball players
Beach volleyball players at the 2000 Summer Olympics
Beach volleyball players at the 2004 Summer Olympics
Olympic beach volleyball players of Italy
Sportspeople from Rome